Three Little Pirates is a 1946 short subject directed by Edward Bernds starring American slapstick comedy team The Three Stooges (Moe Howard, Larry Fine and Curly Howard). It is the 96th entry in the series released by Columbia Pictures starring the comedians, who released 190 shorts for the studio between 1934 and 1959.

Plot
The year is 1642, and the Stooges are garbage scow sailors stranded on Dead Man's Island. At first, the governor (Vernon Dent) finds it hard to believe the three are sailors until they wolf whistle at the first beauty they see, prompting Dent's character to quip "they're sailors, all right...". The governor had planned to make the stooges his galleon slaves but Curly changes his mind once starts flirting with his fiancée, Rita (Christine McIntyre). The governor throws the Stooges in jail, and sentences them to execution, either by beheading or burning at the stake. The sentence is chosen quickly when Curley declares in favor of burning, reasoning that "a hot stake ["steak"] is better than a cold chop."

Lucky for the Stooges, Rita has no interest in marrying the ruthless colonial governor and helps the boys escape by exposing some hidden tools. She then directs them to drill their way through the west wall specifically in order to escape safely. Unfortunately, the Stooges argue incessantly, have Curly choose the wrong wall, and land back in their cell.

Rita suggests the boys disguise themselves as "wayfarers from a strange land" bringing priceless gifts. Curly is the great, nearsighted Maharaja of Canarsie who has domains on the isles of Coney and Long. Moe is the Gin of Rummy, and Larry is an accomplice. Moe and Curly exchange in conversations consisting of doublespeak and gibberish and offer the governor a raspberry lollipop, which he mistakes as a ruby as large as a turkey's egg. Moe dubs it the "Ruby de Lollipopskia." Next is a fountain pen that the governor mistakes as a tusk from a black walrus. The governor is delighted with these gifts, and requests that the Maharaja bring him some fair damsels. The Stooges escape quickly, not wasting a moment. However, the governor's secretary (Dorothy DeHaven) reveals the Stooges' true identities, and the governor is livid. Once he learns they are headed to the cutthroat pirate Black Louie, he enlists his dear pal's help to kill the escaped sailor Stooges.

The Stooges meet Black Louie (Robert Stevens) at a saloon, and engage in a game of target practice. They enlist a reluctant Larry as the live target, and begin the knife-throwing. In the interim, Rita quietly makes her presence known to the boys, and alerts them of the governor's plan. They realize they must flee, but Curly's awkward knife throwing (thanks to his glasses containing lenses as thick as soda bottles) puts Black Louie on the defense. The fight breaks out in the saloon, with the Stooges winning out. As the pirates are defeated, Moe attempts to declare himself Emperor Moe, the new ruler of the island. However, his reign is cut short as he is rendered insensate by a mallet attached to a pinball game, allowing the others to haul him away without protest.

Cast

Credited
Moe Howard as Moe
Larry Fine as Larry
Curly Howard as Curly
Vernon Dent as Governor
Christine McIntyre as Rita Yolanda
Robert Stevens as Black Louie
Dorothy DeHaven as Chiquita

Uncredited
Joe Palma as Jack
Cy Schindell as Dirk
Al Thompson as Pirate

Production notes
This is the 12th of 16 Stooge shorts with the word "three" in the title.

The Stooges had previously performed the "Maharaja" routine in the 1941 film Time Out for Rhythm. They would resurrect the routine with Joe DeRita as the third stooge for the 1963 theatrical feature The Three Stooges Go Around the World in a Daze and on The Steve Allen Show. Moe Howard also later performed a variation of the routine, with Mike Douglas and Soupy Sales, in November 1973 television appearance on The Mike Douglas Show.

Canarsie, Brooklyn, Bay Meadows, Flatbush, Brooklyn, and the isles of Coney Island and Long Island are references to New York-based localities where brothers Moe, Curly, and Shemp Howard spent their childhood. It is all the more appropriate, as the Stooges are sailors shipwrecked off of a New York City garbage scow.

Curly's last hurrah
Three Little Pirates was filmed on April 15–18, 1946, after Curly Howard had suffered a series of minor strokes. As a result of his illness, Curly's performances had been marred by slurred speech and slower timing. Much of the action in previous films (Three Loan Wolves, G.I. Wanna Home) had been shifted away from the ailing Stooge and placed in the hands of co-stars Moe and Larry.

Curly, however, was on his game during the filming of Three Little Pirates. Though still not 100% himself, the comedian performed the memorable "Maharaja" routine with Moe flawlessly. He continued to display his formidable gift for physical comedy; for example, in one shot, he briefly assumes a reclining position while seated on a chair. Director Edward Bernds recalled the progression of Curly's decline through each film in the order they were made (vs. released):

It has been said that the Stooge releases of 1946 were their weakest entries since joining Columbia Pictures in 1934. Much of this was attributed to gravely ill Curly's languid performances. In retrospect, Three Little Pirates turned out to be the only stand-out of the year.

Quotes
Governor: "You may choose the manner in which you will die!"
Larry: "Oh, that's easy: old age! Ha, ha, ha, h..." *SLAP! (from the guard)*
Moe: (to the guard) "Thanks!"
Governor: "You have your choice — you may have your heads chopped off, or you may be burned at the stake."
Curly: "We'll take burning at the stake!"
Governor: "Very well. We'll toast them Monday at sundown."
Moe (angrily): "What did you pick 'burning at the stake' for?!"
Curly: "Cause a hot steak is better than a cold chop!"
Curly: "Eenee, meenee, miney, moe. See, ya can't go wrong with moe."
Moe (sarcastically): "Heh, heh, heh. Thanks!" *SLAP!*

References

External links 
 
 
Three Little Pirates at threestooges.net

1946 films
1946 comedy films
The Three Stooges films
American black-and-white films
Films directed by Edward Bernds
Columbia Pictures short films
American comedy short films
1940s English-language films
1940s American films